Helmut Jagielski (13 March 1934 – 25 December 2002) was a German professional footballer who played as a defender for Schalke 04 and Werder Bremen. With Werder Bremen he won the Bundesliga in the 1964–65 season.

Honours
Werder Bremen
 Bundesliga: 1964–65
 DFB-Pokal: 1960–61

References

External links
 

1934 births
2002 deaths
German footballers
Association football defenders
Bundesliga players
FC Schalke 04 players
SV Werder Bremen players